Li Yujia (Simplified Chinese: 李羽佳; born 18 January 1983) is a Chinese-born Singaporean badminton player who competed at the 2008 Summer Olympics in the women's and mixed doubles event. Born in Jingzhou, Hubei in 1983, she moved to Singapore at the age of 18 and is now a Singapore citizen. Partnered with Hendri Saputra in the mixed doubles and Jiang Yanmei in the women's doubles, she has gained recognition in the badminton scene for her agility, smashing skills and good looks.

Achievements

Commonwealth Games 
Women's doubles

Asian Championships 
Mixed doubles

Southeast Asian Games 
Women's doubles

Mixed doubles

World Junior Championships 
Girls' doubles

Asia Junior Championships 
Girls' doubles

BWF Grand Prix 
The BWF Grand Prix had two levels, the Grand Prix and Grand Prix Gold. It was a series of badminton tournaments sanctioned by the Badminton World Federation (BWF) and played between 2007 and 2017. The World Badminton Grand Prix was sanctioned by the International Badminton Federation from 1983 to 2006.

Women's doubles

Mixed doubles

 BWF Grand Prix Gold tournament
 BWF & IBF Grand Prix tournament

International Series/Satellite 
Women's doubles

Mixed doubles

References

External links 
 
 
 
 
 
 

1983 births
Living people
Badminton players from Hubei
Chinese emigrants to Singapore
Singaporean sportspeople of Chinese descent
Naturalised citizens of Singapore
Chinese female badminton players
Singaporean female badminton players
Badminton players at the 2008 Summer Olympics
Olympic badminton players of Singapore
Badminton players at the 2006 Commonwealth Games
Commonwealth Games silver medallists for Singapore
Commonwealth Games bronze medallists for Singapore
Commonwealth Games medallists in badminton
Badminton players at the 2006 Asian Games
Asian Games bronze medalists for Singapore
Asian Games medalists in badminton
Medalists at the 2006 Asian Games
Competitors at the 2005 Southeast Asian Games
Competitors at the 2007 Southeast Asian Games
Competitors at the 2009 Southeast Asian Games
Southeast Asian Games silver medalists for Singapore
Southeast Asian Games bronze medalists for Singapore
Southeast Asian Games medalists in badminton
Medallists at the 2006 Commonwealth Games